State Route 78 (SR 78) is a  backward question mark-shaped state highway in the southeast part of the U.S. state of Georgia. The highway travels from Soperton north and northwest to Wrightsville, then turning northeast to Wadley and, finally, east, to its eastern terminus, at a point northwest of Midville.

Route description
SR 78 begins at an intersection with SR 46 in the northeast part of Soperton. It heads south, southwest, and northwest to an intersection with U.S. Route 221 (US 221)/SR 15/SR 56 in downtown Soperton. At this point, SR 15 begins a long concurrency with SR 78 to Wrightsville. Two blocks later, SR 78 has a second intersection with SR 46. North of Soperton, SR 78 has an interchange with Interstate 16 (I-16). South of Adrian, SR 86 crosses SR 78's path. When the route arrives in Adrian, it intersects US 80/SR 26. To the northwest, in Wrightsville, SR 78 intersects SR 57. The two routes have a one-block concurrency to the intersection of US 319/SR 15/SR 31. At this intersection, US 319/SR 78 begin a concurrency to the northeast.

South of Bartow, US 221/SR 171 join the concurrency. The four routes head north toward Bartow. Just south of the town, they intersect SR 242. In the town, US 319/SR 78turn to the east, while US 221/SR 171 head north. In Wadley, they intersect US 1 BUS/SR 4 BUS and then the US 1/SR 4 mainline. At the latter intersection, US 319 ends. East of the city, SR 78 meets its northern terminus, at an intersection with SR 17 northwest of Midville

The only portion of SR 78 that is part of the National Highway System, a system of routes determined to be the most important for the nation's economy, mobility, and defense, is the concurrency with SR 15 from Soperton to Wrightsville.

History

Major intersections

See also

References

External links

078
Transportation in Treutlen County, Georgia
Transportation in Emanuel County, Georgia
Transportation in Johnson County, Georgia
Transportation in Jefferson County, Georgia
Transportation in Burke County, Georgia